For the Record is a two-disc, 44-track greatest hits package released by the American country music band Alabama.

The album chronicles the biggest hits from Alabama released between 1980 to 1998. The lineup includes all 33 of their Billboard magazine Hot Country Singles & Tracks No. 1 singles, as well as other songs which reached number one on the former Radio & Records (now Mediabase) charts; each of the non-Billboard No. 1 hits made the top 5 on that chart.

Three new tracks are also included. Of these, "How Do You Fall in Love" reached No. 2 on the Billboard Hot Country Singles & Tracks chart in late 1998. The follow-up single, "Keepin' Up", reached the Top 20 in early 1999, while "Five O'Clock 500" remained an album cut as it was not released as a single.

All of the greatest hits are presented in their single/radio edit forms. In some cases, the songs were nearly two minutes shorter than their original album versions.

The Essential
For the Record was re-released and re-packaged in 2005 as The Essential. Both albums have an identical track lineup. In his review of The Essential, Allmusic reviewer Stephen Thomas Erlewine stated that the new album title eliminated "the misleading subtitle that claimed all of the songs on the album hit No. 1." A disclaimer on the back of the album indicates that The Essential is the newly reissued For the Record.

Sales
The original release of For the Record album was certified platinum for sales of 5 million units by the Recording Industry Association of America.

Song listing

Disc 1
 "Five O'Clock 500" (Teddy Gentry, Randy Owen, Ronnie Rogers) – 3:36A
 "Keepin' Up" (Greg Fowler, Gentry, Owen, Rogers) – 3:05A
 "How Do You Fall in Love" (Fowler, Gentry, Owen) – 3:00A
 "Tennessee River" (Owen) – 3:02
 "Why Lady Why" (Gentry, Rick Scott) – 3:09
 "Old Flame" (Donny Lowery, Mac McAnally) – 3:10
 "Feels So Right" (Owen) – 3:35
 "Love in the First Degree" (Tim DuBois, Jim Hurt) – 3:18
 "Mountain Music" (Owen) – 3:38
 "Take Me Down" (Mark Gray, J.P. Pennington) – 3:43
 "Close Enough to Perfect" (Carl Chambers) –3:33
 "Dixieland Delight" (Rogers) – 3:56
 "The Closer You Get" (Gray, Pennington) – 3:37
 "Lady Down on Love" (Owen) – 3:57
 "Roll On (Eighteen Wheeler)" (Dave Loggins) – 3:43
 "When We Make Love" (Troy Seals, Mentor Williams) – 3:36
 "If You're Gonna Play in Texas (You Gotta Have a Fiddle in the Band)" (Murry Kellum, Dan Mitchell) – 3:22
 "(There's A) Fire in the Night" (Bob Corbin) – 3:57
 "There's No Way" (John Jarrard, Lisa Palas, Will Robinson) – 4:11
 "40 Hour Week (For a Livin')" (Loggins, Don Schlitz, Lisa Silver) – 3:18
 "Can't Keep a Good Man Down" (Corbin) – 3:39
 "She and I" (Loggins) – 3:34

Disc 2
 "Touch Me When We're Dancing" (Kenneth Bell, Terry Skinner, J.L. Wallace) – 3:41
 ""You've Got" the Touch" (Jarrard, Palas, Robinson) – 4:15
 "Face to Face" (Owen) – 3:00
 "Fallin' Again" (Fowler, Gentry, Owen) – 3:59
 "Song of the South" (Bob McDill) – 3:11
 "If I Had You" (Kerry Chater, Danny Mayo) – 3:33
 "High Cotton" (Scott Anders, Roger Murrah) – 3:00
 "Southern Star" (Rich Alves, Steve Dean, Murrah) – 3:08
 "Jukebox in My Mind" (Dave Gibson, Rogers) – 3:39
 "Forever's as Far as I'll Go" (Mike Reid) – 3:33
 "Down Home" (Rick Bowles, Josh Leo) – 3:27
 "Here We Are" (Beth Nielsen Chapman, Vince Gill) – 2:51
 "Then Again" (Bowles, Jeff Silbar) – 3:43
 "Born Country" (Byron Hill, John Schweers) – 3:19
 "I'm in a Hurry (And Don't Know Why)" (Murrah, Randy VanWarmer) – 2:48
 "Once Upon a Lifetime" (Gary Baker, Frank J. Myers) – 4:13
 "Hometown Honeymoon" (Leo, Jim Photoglo) – 3:18
 "Reckless" (Michael Clark, Jeff Stevens) – 3:19
 "Give Me One More Shot" (Gentry, Owen, Rogers) – 3:29
 "She Ain't Your Ordinary Girl" (Robert Jason) – 2:53
 "In Pictures" (Bobby E. Boyd, Joe Doyle) – 3:33
 "Sad Lookin' Moon" (Fowler, Gentry, Owen) – 3:33

A Previously unreleased

Live DVD
A DVD was released with Alabama performing all 41 Number One Hits (plus My Home's In Alabama) at Las Vegas on October 10, 1998 as a promotion to the album. The three new tracks were not performed live.

Track listing

 "Tennessee River" (Extended)
 "Why Lady Why" (Single Version)
 "Old Flame"
 "Feels So Right"
 "Love in the First Degree"
 "Mountain Music" (Extended)
 "Take Me Down" (Single Version)
 "Close Enough to Perfect"
 "Dixieland Delight" (Extended)
 "The Closer You Get" (Intro, Chorus, Bridge and Outro Only)
 "Lady Down on Love"
 "Roll On (Eighteen Wheeler)" (Single Version)
 "When We Make Love"
 "If You're Gonna Play in Texas (You Gotta Have a Fiddle in the Band)"
 "(There's A) Fire in the Night"
 "There's No Way"
 "40 Hour Week (For a Livin')" (Extended)
 "Can't Keep a Good Man Down"
 "She and I" (Short Version)
 "Touch Me When We're Dancing"
 "'You've Got' the Touch"
 "Face to Face"
 "Fallin' Again"
 "Song of the South" (Extended)
 "If I Had You"
 "High Cotton"
 "Southern Star"
 "Jukebox in My Mind"
 "Forever's as Far as I'll Go"
 "Down Home"
 "Here We Are" (Extended Intro)
 "Then Again"
 "Born Country"
 "I'm in a Hurry (And Don't Know Why)"
 "Once Upon a Lifetime"
 "Hometown Honeymoon"
 "Reckless"
 "Give Me One More Shot"
 "She Ain't Your Ordinary Girl"
 "In Pictures"
 "Sad Lookin' Moon" (Extended)
 "My Home's in Alabama" (Extended)

Personnel on Tracks 1-3 (Disk #1)

Alabama
 Randy Owen - lead vocals
 Jeff Cook - background vocals
 Teddy Gentry - bass guitar, background vocals

Alabama's drummer, Mark Herndon, does not play on the new tracks.

Additional Musicians
 Mark Casstevens - acoustic guitar
 Don Cook - background vocals
 Steve Dorff - string arrangements, conductor
 Larry Franklin - fiddle
 John Barlow Jarvis - piano, B-3 organ
 Brent Mason - electric guitar, 12-string electric guitar, gut string guitar
 Steve Nathan - keyboards
 Lonnie Wilson - drums, percussion

Charts

Weekly charts
As For the Record

As The Essential

Year-end charts
As For the Record

Certifications

References

1998 greatest hits albums
2005 greatest hits albums
Alabama (band) compilation albums
RCA Records compilation albums